Helmut Haugk (24 February 1914 – 28 January 1992) was a Luftwaffe ace and recipient of the Knight's Cross of the Iron Cross during World War II.  The Knight's Cross of the Iron Cross was awarded to recognise extreme battlefield bravery or successful military leadership. Haugk claimed 18 aerial victories in more than 440 flights.

On 29 September 1939, while serving with 3. Staffel of Zerstörergeschwader 26 (ZG 26—26th Destroyer Wing), Haugk was shot down and wounded when in his Messerschmitt Bf 109 D-1 (Werknummer 481—factory number) during combat with Royal Air Force (RAF) Handley Page Hampden southeast of Heligoland.

His brother Leutnant Werner Haugk, who had received the Knight's Cross of the Iron Cross as Fahnenjunker-Oberfeldwebel after approximately 300 combat missions on 8 August 1944, was shot down and killed in action on 18 October 1944 near Aalborg, Denmark by British fighters while flying a Bf 109 trainer.

Summary of career

Aerial victory claims
Mathews and Foreman, authors of Luftwaffe Aces — Biographies and Victory Claims, researched the German Federal Archives and found records for twelve aerial victory claims over the Western Allies, including one heavy bomber.

Awards and decorations
 Aviator badge
 Front Flying Clasp of the Luftwaffe in Gold
 Iron Cross (1939)
 2nd Class (13 October 1939)
 1st Class (23 May 1940)
 Wound Badge (1939)
 in Black
 in Silver
 Ehrenpokal der Luftwaffe (1 March 1941)
 German Cross in Gold on 14 February 1942 as Oberfeldwebel in the 7./Zerstörergeschwader 26
 Knight's Cross of the Iron Cross on 21 December 1942 as Oberfeldwebel and pilot in the 9./Zerstörergeschwader 26 "Horst Wessel"

Notes

References

Citations

Bibliography

 
 
 
 
 
 
 
 

1914 births
1992 deaths
People from the Rhine Province
German World War II flying aces
Luftwaffe pilots
Recipients of the Gold German Cross
Recipients of the Knight's Cross of the Iron Cross
Military personnel from Gelsenkirchen
Recipients of the Medal of Aeronautic Valor